The 1979 Amstel Gold Race was the 14th edition of the annual road bicycle race "Amstel Gold Race", held on Sunday April 14, 1979, in the Dutch province of Limburg. The race stretched 237 kilometres, with the start in Heerlen and the finish in Meerssen. There were a total of 137 competitors, and 32 cyclists finished the race.

Result

Amstel Gold Race
1979 in road cycling
1979 in Dutch sport
April 1979 sports events in Europe
1979 Super Prestige Pernod